WCUB (980 AM/97.1 FM) is a Country formatted radio station licensed to Two Rivers, Wisconsin, that serves the Two Rivers, Manitowoc, and Sheboygan areas, along with strong city-grade coverage of Brown County and Green Bay. The station is owned by Mark Seehafer, through licensee Seehafer Broadcasting Corp. The station is translated on the FM dial through W246DY, which is also licensed to Two Rivers, and launched in early May 2020 as a part of the FCC's AM revitalization plan.

WCUB airs Fox News Radio and is also the home of NASCAR radio coverage from all three NASCAR radio networks in the lakeshore/metro Green Bay region, along with the Indianapolis 500's radio network (including the Brickyard 400).

External links

CUB
Radio stations established in 1952